Catwoman is a 2004 American superhero film loosely based on the DC Comics character Catwoman. It was directed by Pitof and written by John Rogers, John Brancato and Michael Ferris from a story by Theresa Rebeck, Brancato and Ferris, with music by Klaus Badelt. The film stars Halle Berry as Catwoman, plus Benjamin Bratt, Lambert Wilson, Frances Conroy, Alex Borstein, and Sharon Stone in supporting roles. The film centers on Patience Phillips, a meek designer who discovers a conspiracy within the cosmetics company she works for that involves a dangerous product that could cause widespread health problems. After being discovered and murdered by the conspirators, she is revived by Egyptian cats that grant her superhuman cat-like abilities, allowing her to become the crime-fighting superheroine Catwoman, while also romancing a detective who pursues her.

Produced by Village Roadshow Pictures and Denise Di Novi's Di Novi Pictures, Catwoman was released theatrically on July 23, 2004 by Warner Bros. Pictures and performed poorly at the box office, grossing $82 million against a budget of $100 million. The film received seven Golden Raspberry Award nominations and won in the categories of Worst Picture, Worst Actress, Worst Director and Worst Screenplay; the film was lambasted by critics and many considered it to be one of the worst films of all time, with criticism directed at the performances, direction, CGI, editing, costume design, pacing, plot, dialogue and unfaithfulness to the source material, including the lack of connection to Batman.

Plot
Artist Patience Phillips is a meek people-pleaser whose main support is her best friend Sally. She works for a cosmetics company called Hedare Beauty, which is ready to ship a new skin cream called Beau-line that is able to reverse the effects of aging. However, when Patience visits the R&D laboratory facility to deliver a redone ad design, she overhears a discussion between scientist Dr. Ivan Slavicky and Laurel Hedare, the wife of company-owner George Hedare, about the dangerous side effects from continually using the product. Laurel's guards discover Patience and are ordered to dispose of her. Patience tries to escape using a conduit pipe, but the minions have it sealed and flush her out of it, drowning her. Washed up on shore, Patience is mysteriously revived by an Egyptian Mau cat named Midnight which had appeared at her apartment earlier; from that moment on, she develops cat-like attributes.

From Midnight's owner eccentric researcher Ophelia Powers, Patience learns that Egyptian Mau cats serve as messengers of the goddess Bast. Patience realizes that she is now a "catwoman", reborn with abilities that are both a blessing and a curse. Disguised as a mysterious vigilante, named Catwoman to hide her identity, Patience under cover of darkness, searches for answers as to who killed her and why. Eventually, her search (which includes finding Slavicky's body and later being accused of his murder) leads her to Laurel. She asks Laurel to keep an eye on George, to which Laurel agrees. However, when Patience confronts George (who is attending an opera with another woman) as Catwoman, he reveals that he knows nothing about the side effects. The police led by Patience's love interest, detective Tom Lone, arrive and Catwoman escapes. Later on, Laurel murders George for his infidelity and admits to having Dr. Slavicky killed because he wanted to cancel the product's release. She contacts Catwoman and frames her for the murder. Tom then takes Catwoman into custody. Laurel plans to release Beau-line to the public the following day.

Patience slips out of her cell and confronts Laurel in her office, rescuing Tom; who came to question Laurel after second thoughts about Patience's guilt in the process and revealing that Laurel is the one responsible for her death. Laurel reveals the product's side effects; discontinuing its use makes the skin disintegrate, while continuing its use makes the skin as hard as marble. During the fight, she scratches Laurel's face several times, causing Laurel to fall out of a window and grab onto a pipe. Laurel sees her face in a window's reflection, and horrified by her skin's rapid disintegration (as a result of the scratches and her own use of Beau-line over the years), she fails to grab hold of Patience's outstretched arm and falls to her death.

Although Patience is cleared of any charges made against her regarding the deaths of Dr. Slavicky and the Hedares, she decides to end things with Tom by choosing to continue living outside the law and enjoying her newfound freedom as the mysterious Catwoman.

Cast

 Halle Berry as Patience Phillips / Catwoman
 Benjamin Bratt as Detective Tom Lone
 Sharon Stone as Laurel Hedare
 Lambert Wilson as George Hedare
 Frances Conroy as Ophelia Powers
 Alex Borstein as Sally
 Michael Massee as Armando
 Byron Mann as Wesley
 Alex Cooper as Gloria Ojeda
 Kim Smith as Drina
 Peter Wingfield as Dr. Ivan Slavicky
 Berend McKenzie as Lance

Missy Peregrym appears uncredited as the Hedare factory computer monitor image (Beau-line graphics model), depicting the bad effects of the beauty product. A photograph of Michelle Pfeiffer as Selina Kyle / Catwoman in Batman Returns are among the pictures that Ophelia shows to Patience of former Catwomen.

Production

Development
With Warner Bros. developing Batman Forever in June 1993, a Catwoman spin-off film was announced. Michelle Pfeiffer was cast to reprise her role from Batman Returns, Tim Burton became attached as director, and producer Denise Di Novi and writer Daniel Waters also returned. In January 1994, Burton was unsure of his plans to direct Catwoman or an adaptation of "The Fall of the House of Usher". On June 16, 1995, Waters turned in his Catwoman script to Warner Bros., the same day Batman Forever was released. Burton was still being courted to direct. Waters joked, "turning it in the day Batman Forever opened may not have been my best logistical move, in that it's the celebration of the fun-for-the-whole-family Batman. Catwoman is definitely not a fun-for-the-whole-family script." In an August 1995 interview, Pfeiffer reiterated her interest in the spin-off but explained her priorities would be challenged as a mother and commitments to other projects.

The film labored in development hell for years with Ashley Judd as the lead in 2001, but she eventually dropped out so Nicole Kidman was considered. When Warner Bros. canceled a Batman vs. Superman film scheduled for 2004, the studio decided to quickly produce Catwoman as replacement, starring Halle Berry. Berry chose to be involved with the film after the cancellation of Jinx, a James Bond spin-off featuring her character Giacinta "Jinx" Johnson from Die Another Day (2002). Josh Lucas was considered for the role of Tom Lone.

Costume
The catsuit was designed by Academy Award-winning costume designer Angus Strathie together with Berry, director Pitof, and producers Di Novi and McDonnell. Strathie explained, "We wanted a very reality-based wardrobe to show the progression from demure, repressed Patience to the sensual awakening of a sexy warrior goddess."

Choreography and training
Berry started intensive fitness training with Harley Pasternak in June 2003. Choreographer Anne Fletcher instructed Berry in cat-like movement, and in the Brazilian martial art style Capoeira. Berry was trained to crack a whip by coach Alex Green.

Filming
Principal photography began in late September 2003. Shooting took place on 4th Street in downtown Los Angeles, California, in Winnipeg, Manitoba, at Lionsgate Film Studios, Vancouver, British Columbia, and at Warner Bros. Burbank Studios, 4000 Warner Boulevard, Burbank, California. Most of the cats cast in the film came from animal shelters throughout California. Filming finished on February 20, 2004.

Release

Theatrical
The film was originally given an IMAX release coinciding with the general release as evidenced by a poster with the tagline "CATch Her in IMAX", but Warner Bros. announced its cancellation on June 30, 2004, because the delays on the visual effects did not give IMAX enough time to remaster the film in time for its release.

Home media
Catwoman was released on VHS and DVD on January 18, 2005, and on Blu-ray on September 8, 2009.

Reception

Box office
Catwoman earned a gross of $40,202,379 in North America and $41,900,000 in other territories for a worldwide total of $82,102,379 against a production budget of $100 million.

The film grossed $16,728,411 in its opening weekend playing in 3,117 theaters, with a $5,366 per-theatre average and ranking #3 alongside The Bourne Supremacy and I, Robot. The biggest market in other territories being France, Spain, Japan and Mexico where the film grossed $5.2 million, $4.05 million, $3.05 million and $2.9 million, while topping the Bulgarian weekend listing.

Critical response

The site's critical consensus reads, "Halle Berry is the lone bright spot, but even she can't save this laughable action thriller." On Metacritic, the film has a score of 27 out of 100 based on 35 critics, indicating "generally unfavorable reviews". Audiences polled by CinemaScore gave the film an average grade of "B" on an A+ to F scale.

The film appeared on the list of Roger Ebert's most hated films. He criticized the filmmakers for giving little thought to providing Berry "with a strong character, story, supporting characters or action sequences", but he primarily criticized the film for failing to give the audience a sense of what her character experienced as she was transformed into Catwoman. He rather referred to it as being a movie "about Halle Berry's beauty, sex appeal, figure, eyes, lips, and costume design. It gets those right". On their At the Movies show, Ebert and his former co-host Richard Roeper both gave the film a "thumbs down". 

In a scholarly analysis of female protagonists in action cinema, Heldman et al said that the film ends with Catwoman choosing "a solo existence as her sexualized body slinks into the full moon; even this otherwise agentic act is constructed for the consumption of the male gaze that follows her. The film presents her agency, power, and freedom as derivative of her hypersexualization." Bill Muller of The Arizona Republic stated that Berry should possibly give back her 2001 Academy Award as a penalty for the film.

Accolades

Berry arrived at the ceremony to accept her Razzie in person while carrying her Best Actress Oscar. She semi-sarcastically described the finished film as "a piece of shit, godawful movie" and quipped "It was just what my career needed,"

Оther media

A video game based on the film was published by Electronic Arts UK and Argonaut Games. Featuring voice actor Jennifer Hale, the game varies from the film's plot and received negative reviews on Metacritic.

In 2003, Warner Bros. approached Boyd Kirkland to write a script for a Catwoman direct-to-video animated feature film to tie-in with the film's release. Although the script was written, the project was discarded due to the film's critical and box office failure.

See also
 List of films based on DC Comics publications
 List of films considered the worst

References

External links

 
 

2004 films
2000s English-language films
2004 action films
2000s superhero films
African-American superhero films
American action films
American superhero films
Batman (1989 film series)
Catwoman in other media
Films based on works by Bob Kane
Films based on works by Bill Finger
Superheroine films
Films scored by Klaus Badelt
Films produced by Denise Di Novi
Films shot in Los Angeles
Films shot in Vancouver
Films about cats
Films with screenplays by John Rogers
Mariticide in fiction
Resurrection in film
American vigilante films
Village Roadshow Pictures films
Warner Bros. films
Films based on Egyptian mythology
Films directed by Pitof
Golden Raspberry Award winning films
2000s American films
Films based on DC Comics
Bastet